All Systems Are Go was The Archers’ final return to Light Records.  The album scored a hit with “Heaven in Your Eyes,” a duet with Tim and Janice.  The album also landed The Archers their first TV show of the same name on the Trinity Broadcasting Network.  The “All Systems Are Go” Tour would be their final tour with a Live Band.

Track listing 
 "All Systems Are Go" (Jeremy Dalton) — 4:09
 "What's It Gonna Take" (Jeremy Dalton) — 4:24
 "Heaven in Your Eyes" (Jeremy Dalton) — 4:00
 "Get Ready Get Right" (Steve Archer, Bob Somma) — 4:10
 "My Hope" (John MacArthur, Jr., Sterling Crew) — 4:22
 "Walk Like He Walks" (Jeremy Dalton) — 3:42
 "Winnin' Again" (Steve Archer, Dan Cutrona) — 4:26
 "Don' Let It" (Tim Archer, John A. Schreiner) — 3:22
 "Every Good and Perfect Gift" (Jeremy Dalton) — 6:28

“Winnin’ Again” also appeared a year later as a bonus song on the LP version of Steve Archer’s 1985 album “Action”

Personnel

Musicians
 Bob Somma: guitar
 James Jamison: bass
 John Andrew Schreiner and Herb Jamerson: keyboards
 Albert Wing: saxophone
 Lee Kicks: drums
 Joe Lala: percussion

Production

 Produced by Skip Konte, Tim and Steve Archer
 Executive producer - Tim Archer
 Engineered by Skip Konte
 Recorded at Front Page Productions, Costa Mesa, California
 Arrangements by Herb Jamerson
 Mastered by Bernie Grundman
 Photography by Craig Incardone
 Hair by Craig DePhillippi
 Cover art direction and illustration - Kernie Erickson. Sleeve Design - Bob Payne

References 

 Archers: Cutting Edge Music Discography
 Light Records Discography
 The Archers.US
 Archers.org

The Archers (musical group) albums
1984 albums